Siegfried Theofiel Hortense Bracke (born 21 February 1953) is a former Belgian politician and is affiliated to the N-VA. He was elected as a member of the Belgian Chamber of Representatives in 2010. Bracke was born in Ghent. Before his political career he had a long career as a journalist, working for the VRT (Vlaamse Radio- en Televisieomroep - the primary Flemish-Belgian broadcasting company), hosting various politics-related shows such as Villa Politica and Bracke en Crabbé. He is a supporter of Orangism. After the elections in 2019 he ended his political career.

Notes

External links

1953 births
Ghent University alumni
Living people
Presidents of the Chamber of Representatives (Belgium)
Members of the Chamber of Representatives (Belgium)
New Flemish Alliance politicians
Politicians from Ghent
Male journalists
Flemish journalists
Belgian radio journalists
Belgian television journalists
Belgian television presenters
21st-century Belgian politicians